Nilson António Veiga Barros (born 5 August 1987), better known as Nilson, is a Cape Verdean professional footballer who plays as a left back. He played for Portimonense between 2008 and 2011. Nilson signed with CSKA Sofia in the summer of 2012, but sustained an injury in October 2012, which kept him out of action for a number of months. After his recovery, he decided to continue his career with Portimonense, agreeing to terms in February 2013.

Club statistics

References

External links

1987 births
Living people
Cape Verdean footballers
Association football defenders
People from Santiago, Cape Verde
Primeira Liga players
Liga Portugal 2 players
First Professional Football League (Bulgaria) players
Cypriot First Division players
Portimonense S.C. players
AEL Limassol players
PFC CSKA Sofia players
Doxa Katokopias FC players
C.F. União players
Cape Verde international footballers
Cape Verdean expatriate footballers
Expatriate footballers in Portugal
Expatriate footballers in Cyprus
Expatriate footballers in Bulgaria